Krzysztof Lubieniecki or Christoffel Lubienietzky (1659–1729) was a Polish Baroque painter and engraver active in Amsterdam during the Dutch Golden Age.

Biography
Krzysztof Lubieniecki was born in Stettin (today: Szczecin), Pommerania. His brother Teodor Lubieniecki was also a painter and engraver. They learned to paint from the landscape and seascape painter Juriaan Stur in Hamburg. In 1667 they travelled to Amsterdam, where Krzysztof apprenticed with Adriaen Backer, and Teodor with Gerard de Lairesse. In 1682, Teodor moved to Hannover before eventually moving to Poland in 1706, where he died.

Krzysztof remained in Amsterdam, where he painted portraits and genre pieces. He also collaborated on prints for Jacobus Houbraken, and Johannes Brandt (son of Gerard Brandt).  He died in Amsterdam.

In 1944 a Lubieniecki painting Portrait of a young man was looted from the National Museum of Warsaw by the Nazis during the Warsaw Uprising. It was in turn seized by an American serviceman and not returned to Polish authorities before 2015.

References 

 prints by C. Lubnietzki in Amsterdam Archives
 Christoffel Lubienitzki in the RKD
 Artnet.com, Christoffel Lubieniecki

External links

1659 births
1729 deaths
17th-century engravers
18th-century engravers
Polish engravers
17th-century Polish painters
Polish male painters
18th-century Polish–Lithuanian painters
18th-century male artists
Dutch Golden Age painters
Dutch male painters
Artists from Szczecin
Polish emigrants to the Netherlands